Vista Peak is located on the border of Alberta and British Columbia. It was named in 1917, the name refers to the view from the peak of the mountain.

See also
 List of peaks on the Alberta–British Columbia border
 Mountains of Alberta
 Mountains of British Columbia

References

Vista Peak
Vista Peak
Canadian Rockies